The Covers EP is a Freezepop EP. The EP is available for free for those who sign up for the band's email newsletter, being a gift for this action. After signing up for the band's email newsletter, a link is sent to the subscriber email that gives access to the EP download.

Track listing

Booklet Information
 'Jem Theme' (by Anne Bryant): Originally performed by Jem and the Holograms, 1985 This was a hidden bonus track on Fancy Ultra•Fresh in 2004. It was The Duke’s idea. After we released it, I heard from series creator Kristy Marx, who gave us a thumbs-up (and didn’t sue us!) A few years later, it inexplicably went viral on YTMND, which was a pretty entertaining couple of weeks. 
 'Sprite: "Melonball Bounce"' (by Raymond Scott): Originally performed by Raymond Scott, 1963. This was a hidden bonus track on Fashion Impression Function, 2001. A tribute to a major electronic music pioneer, and a delicious beverage.
 'Only You' (by Vince Clarke): Originally released by Yazoo, 1982 We did this one for a Buffet Libre covers comp in 2009. We have a couple of Vince Clarke-authored songs on here. Dude is pretty okay at writing the electronic pop songs. 
 'Photographic' (by Vince Clarke): Originally released in 1981 by Depeche Mode From our Dancy Ultra•Fresh vinyl, 2005. More Vince Clarke goodness. That’s The Duke on main vocals.
 'Seven-Boom Medley' (by Miki Chieregato, Riccardo Ballerini, Roberto Turatti, Stefano Montin, Tom Hooker, Dennis van Den Driesschen, Benny Andersson, Wessel van Diepen, Björn Ulvaeus): “Boom Boom (Let's Go Back to My Room)” originally performed by Paul Lekakis, 1987 “Boom, Boom, Boom, Boom!!” originally performed by Vengaboys, 1999 Wayyy back from 2001. This song got kinda popular on Limewire, ha ha. Although we were fully aware that it was incredibly cheesy at the time, it’s still a little embarrassing. I mean, in a mostly-good way.
 'The Number 1 Song in Heaven' (by Ron Mael, Russell Mael, Giorgio Moroder): Originally released in 1979 by Sparks One of my favorite dance songs. Our version was 2003, I think? This was at the peak of Liz E. cold, emotionless vocal delivery. I did not even attempt to approximate Russell Mael’s histrionics. That’s best left in the hands of professionals.
 'Sweater Weather' (by Brian E. King): Originally released by Parks, 2012 We recorded this in 2013 for a comp called Boston Does Boston, featuring many Boston bands covering each other’s songs (which also included an epic metal version of Less Talk More Rokk by Black Thai, seek that one out).

Personnel 
 The Duke of Candied Apples
 Liz Enthusiasm
 Sean T. Drinkwater

References

External links 
 Freezepop.net
 https://www.discogs.com/Freezepop-The-Covers-EP/release/6728529
 https://musicbrainz.org/release/7819ee4c-060d-4a0a-a3f8-857914be5aa4

2015 EPs
Covers EPs